is a former Japanese football player.

Club statistics

References

External links

1985 births
Living people
Association football people from Shizuoka Prefecture
Japanese footballers
J1 League players
J2 League players
Nagoya Grampus players
Japan Soccer College players
JEF United Chiba players
Association football defenders